Redux Riding Hood is a 15-minute animated short film directed by Steve Moore and produced by Disney in 1997 that received an Oscar nomination for Best Animated Short Film.

The film was produced with cel animation and 2-D collage elements and it originated from a set of four short/featurettes planned by Disney and MovieToons (to be titled "Totally Twisted Fairy Tales"), which was also to include "Jack in the Beanstalk," "The Three Little Pigs" and a fourth cartoon that was never finalized. The idea was to make a more adult short by combining Disney artists and high-quality writers and their takes on classic fairy tales.

Plot 
Redux Riding Hood, written by sitcom writer Dan O'Shannon, tells the familiar story of Red Riding Hood from the point of view of the Big Bad Wolf. The Wolf (voiced by Michael Richards) is haunted by the decision to eat Red Riding Hood after dressing up as her grandmother, not because he regrets the choice, but because he’s convinced he can do it better now that he’s learned from his mistakes. But to do that, he has to build a time machine and avoid his poor wife (Mia Farrow). Can the wolf rewrite fairy-tale history or is he destined to never gobble down poor Red?

At his first attempt, the Big Bad Wolf succeeded to return to the past where he finds his past self. He then advises him about what and what not to do and succeeds to knock out the Hunter, who was the reason of his failure, and capture Little Red Riding Hood with a double team. However, the two wolves never expected to lock the Grandma at the armory closet, so she shoots at them with a machine gun. The two wolves return to the present with new regrets and failures. His wife advised them that they are probably not meant to catch Red Riding Hood, but they were too obsessed on their failures to listen. At his second attempt the two wolves now have a triple team and succeeded to dodge their failures but never expected Red’s scream was loud enough to set off the fire alarm flooding the three wolves out of grandma’s house. After that, the wolves made series of ridiculous failures and failures keep increasing until he had hundreds of himself that he keeps changing his fate and still search for solution with even more bizarre ending. His wife couldn't take it anymore and feel like she deserved better. Eventually, she decided to take his time machine for herself and correct her biggest regret; she decided to marry someone else.

Cast

Production 
The show was produced by Walt Disney Television Animation (WDTA) and Toonz Animation Ltd New Zealand with an uncredited DTVA unit, Disney MovieToons. Gnome Productions Ltd. New Zealand was credited as an additional production facility. Buena Vista Imaging produced titles and opticals.

Departing from Disney's storied tradition of family entertainment, Redux was supposed to be the first in a line of "Totally Twisted Fairy Tales" reinvented certain fairy tales with an offbeat, adult-oriented, comedic slant through the talents of veteran sitcom (Cheers, Newhart) writer Dan O'Shannon and animation producer/director Steve Moore. Voices are provided by luminaries like Seinfelds Michael Richards, Don Rickles, Lacey Chabert (Party of Five) and Mia Farrow.

The series was a creative project that bring light back to animators that were down from a lack of non-adult projects. O'Shannon from the prospect of "Redux" opened up doors for out of the ordinary imaginative writers. The film turned out well, and scored an Oscar nomination, but then Disney put it on the shelf in 1998, and it has remained there ever since.

Music 
The music was arranged by jazz great Bennie Wallace, his credibility in music reached great lengths especially in this production. The melody was inspired from Charles Mingus' album Mingus Mingus Mingus Mingus Mingus. Bennie set to the task, casting his musicians to get the right sound - among them Robben Ford on guitar, Emil Richards on percussion instruments, Art Baron on trombone, Alex Acuna brought a Latin beat on drums, and Bennie himself on Sax. The music was recorded at Capitol Records in Hollywood, in Sinatra's old stage.

See also
Shrek - similar in content
Chicken Little - similar in plot and concept
Olive, the Other Reindeer

References

External links
 
 

1997 films
1997 short films
Walt Disney Pictures films
1997 animated films
Films based on Little Red Riding Hood
American parody films
Fairy tale parody films
1990s Disney animated short films
Animated films about wolves
Disney Television Animation films
Animated films about foxes
1990s rediscovered films
Rediscovered American films
1990s English-language films